Rasbora maninjau is a species of ray-finned fish in the genus Rasbora. It is endemic to Lake Maninjau in Sumatra.

References 

Rasboras
Freshwater fish of Sumatra
Taxa named by Daniel Lumbantobing
Fish described in 2014